Pheidole debilis is a species of ant in the genus Pheidole. It was discovered and described by Longino, J. T. in 2009.

References

debilis
Insects described in 2009